Grenoble Ecole de Management (GEM) is a French graduate business school (Grande Ecole) renowned for its teaching in innovation and management.

The consular institution was founded in 1984 in Grenoble, in the Auvergne-Rhone Alpes region, by the Chamber of Commerce and Industry (CCI) of Grenoble.

The school was ranked among the top 10 French business schools.

GEM is part of the Conférence des Grandes écoles, and one of the only 1% of business schools in the world which holds the "Triple Crown" of international business school accreditations: EQUIS by the EFMD, AMBA, and the AACSB.

Some criticism has been made towards GEM, such as the school being detached from its students and their well-being, and focusing more onto making profit. It has also been criticized for greenwashing practices. 

In 2021, GEM is the first French business school to become an entreprise à mission. Corporate social responsibility is managed by a committee of students, administrators and teachers. It aims to provide answers, through training and research, to the major challenges of the ecological, societal and economic transition.

Overview

History
 1984: Foundation of Groupe ESC Grenoble, the first French Business school affiliated to Grandes écoles, to offer curricula based on technology management.
 1988: Launch of the first specialized Master in International Marketing of New Technologies.
 1990: 20th international exchange agreement with partner universities.
 1993: The first French DBA (Doctor of Business Administration), AMBA accredited is developed at the school, in partnership with Henley Management College.
 1995: The Master in International Business (MIB) is created; the management of technology becomes intercultural.
 1997: Opening up of 3,000 square meters of space in the school dedicated to multimedia and international programs. Sup de Co Grenoble is located in the World trade center, business area at Grenoble. ESC Grenoble collaborated with engineering schools (INPG, ENSIMAG, ENST Bretagne, Mines Telecom...)
 2000: Groupe ESC Grenoble receives EQUIS accreditation from the EFMD, placing it among the top business schools in Europe. A recruitment office is opened in Shanghai, to expose the Chinese market to the school's international programs.
 2001: Groupe ESC Grenoble becomes a multi-site school by setting up its programs internationally: 1 in Russia, 1 in Moldova, 1 in Malta, 2 in China.
 40% of the student bodies now comes from abroad.
 2002: Thierry Grange (International director, honorary consul of Norway, ex-CEO) becomes dean and director general of Groupe ESC Grenoble.
 2003: ESC Grenoble group change its name and becomes Grenoble Ecole de Management

 2004: Grenoble Ecole de Management obtains AACSB accreditation, an international recognition of the school's quality, and is awarded AMBA accreditation for its MBA program.  GEM is triple accredited with AMBA-EQUIS-AACSB.
 2004-05: The school's Master in International Business program receives PEMM accreditation from AMBA and is ranked eighth in the Financial Times ranking of European Masters in Management.
 2007: Geopolitics becomes compulsory both in the ESC Grenoble entry exam and in the core curriculum ("Grande Ecole program").
 2008: Grenoble Ecole de Management is a founding member of the Innovation Campus GIANT alongside the ESRF, ILL, EMBL, CNRS, CEA, Grenoble INP and the UJF.
 2009: The school jumps 11 places in the annual Financial Times European business schools ranking, having been ranked in the top 20 best schools in Europe.
 2010: Grenoble Ecole de Management partners with Harvard Business School.
 2012: Former Associate Director, Vice-Dean in charge of Academics, Research and Faculty, Senior Professor, Management and Behaviour, Loïck Roche becomes Grenoble Ecole de Management's third director.
 2013: Grenoble Ecole de Management opens a new campus in Paris to promote its international and executive education programs.
 2016: On March 14, during an interview with "Le Monde", Lise Dumasy, president of the University of Grenoble-Alpes (UGA), declared that Grenoble-Alpes University and Grenoble School of Management (GEM) will deliver double degrees in Engineering, law, politics, philosophy and economics fields.
 2016: The school partners with Hannover-based GISMA Business School to open a new campus in Berlin. 
At the end of March, Grenoble Ecole de Management (GEM) and EMLYON Business School announce their alliance, the Alliance Lyon Grenoble Business School, centered on innovation, entrepreneurship, growth and new business.
 2017: Grenoble Ecole de Management is consistently ranked among "the 5 best universities and business schools in France" according to  Le Figaro, Financial Times for MS in management and by The Economist 2018 and QS World University 2018 for global MBA.
 2019: Grenoble has a network of more than 40,500 alumni in the world with representatives at London, Dubai, Berlin, Hong Kong, San Francisco.

Grande école degrees 
GEM is a grande école, a French institution of higher education that is separate from, but parallel and often connected to, the main framework of the French public university system. Grandes écoles are elite academic institutions that admit students through an extremely competitive process, and a significant proportion of their graduates occupy the highest levels of French society. Similar to Ivy League schools in the United States, Oxbridge in the UK, and C9 League in China, graduation from a grande école is considered the prerequisite credential for any top government, administrative and corporate position in France.

The degrees are accredited by the Conférence des Grandes Écoles and awarded by the Ministry of National Education (France). Higher education business degrees in France are organized into three levels thus facilitating international mobility: the Licence / Bachelor's degrees, and the Master's and Doctorat degrees. The Bachelors and the Masters are organized in semesters: 6 for the Bachelors and 4 for the Masters. Those levels of study include various "parcours" or paths based on UE (Unités d'enseignement or Modules), each worth a defined number of European credits (ECTS). A student accumulates those credits, which are generally transferable between paths. A Bachelors is awarded once 180 ECTS have been obtained (bac + 3); a Masters is awarded once 120 additional credits have been obtained (bac +5). The highly coveted PGE (Grand Ecole Program) ends with the degree of Master's in Management (MiM)

Since 2004, Grenoble Ecole de Management is one of the few (1%) management schools worldwide awarded with the prestigious "Triple crown" accreditations : Its accreditations are regularly renewed, and each one for the maximum period of five years.

The school's DBA program is one of only eleven doctoral programs in the World to be also accredited by AMBA.

Programs
The Grenoble Ecole de Management (GEM) covers all fields of management by offering an academic program with: the Master in Management (Grande Ecole) taught in the most selective French business schools "écoles supérieures de commerce"; the Bachelor of International Business (BIB) ranked first in France (Le Parisien) and various undergraduate certificates and graduates including : the 
MBA, EMBA, MIB, and the 13+ Master's level programs MSc. All are delivered in English or French - emphasize innovation, technology and intercultural management.

The PhD program has been launched in 2009 and is offered in four majors : marketing, finance, strategy and innovation management, and organisational sciences.

Worldwide rankings

GEM is consistently rated by the Financial Times, The Economist, Shanghai ranking and QS World University rankings as one of the top business schools in continental Europe ("Business administration", "Management", "Economics") and one of the leading business schools worldwide.

The school has been ranked second after HEC for sustainable & ecology development by Le Figaro, FT and Davos's Forum. Grenoble École de Management is recognized as one of the observers of COP26. Grenoble's city wins the European Green Capital 2022 award delivered by the European Commission.

Pedagogy and departments

GEM is member of the Management School Chapter of the Conférence des Grandes Ecoles and associated with Mines-Telecom, the number ONE group of Engineering and Management graduate schools in France.

Pedagogy at the Grenoble School of Management is organized by the academic research departments: Management and Technology, Marketing, 
Accounting, Law and Finance, Computer Science, Management and Behavior, Modern Languages and Foreign Cultures and Applied Learning and is delivered through a mix of face-to-face lectures, excursions, projects, and e-learning, in either English or French.

GEM also delivers courses entirely in English with : "100% English Track", "trilingual course", and :"transcontinental course" in agreement with Cambridge (UK), Beihang University (China), McGill (Canada), and Columbia University (USA).

There are many international exchanges of staff and students including a longstanding partnership with Trinity College Dublin, and Dublin Institute of Technology, Ireland (ranked in Times Higher Education's top 100 university-level institutions globally) and with other partners on five continents.

GEM collaborates each year in "Serious Games" with the MIT Sloan School of Management, us. and with MIT GSW for Startup conferences.

The school is involved in the Global Compact program delivered by United Nations initiative (UN) that brings together firms, the business world and the civil society united on ten universal principles relative to human rights, working conditions and the environment.

GEM hosts the student association Altigliss which organizes the World cup Ski and Snowboard competition for students in the Alps.

Research

Grenoble Ecole de Management has over 90 research-active scholars, the school and its research are regularly ranked among top European and French business schools.

Grenoble Ecole de Management conducts research in the following themes:

 Business & Finances
 Economy, society, and organizations
 Marketing
 Technology management
 Strategy, innovation, and entrepreneurship

Besides hosting a number of academic and applied research centers  GEM is part of various important national and international research initiatives such as: MEDFORIST, GIANT (CNRS), and the European Institute of Innovation and Technology.

Student life
GEM Alumni is the association of former students (40,500+) and is represented in several countries (London, Dubai, Hong Kong, San Francisco ...) with local branches, and animates meetings (webinars, business clubs, afterworks ...).

The student association GEM Altigliss Challenge organizes (21st edition) each year the student world cup of skiing and snowboarding in Alpin mountains.

The school's location (HQ) is multicultural with 130 nationalities and with the nearest foreign cities : Geneva, Switzerland; or with Turin, Italy, and several offices in the World.

Since 2009 GEM has also hosted the annual "Grenoble Geopolitics Festival" to illustrate Geopolitic impacts and alliances on economics and financial markets.

GEM has around 7200 students and 600 teaching staff.

References

Business schools in France
Universities and colleges in Grenoble
Grandes écoles
Private universities and colleges in France
Educational institutions established in 1984
1984 establishments in France